Petra Kučová Raclavská (born 26 February 1973) is a Czech former professional tennis player. She competed as Petra Kučová before marriage.

Raclavská, who comes from Olomouc, reached the girls' doubles semifinals of both Wimbledon and the US Open in 1990.

On the professional tour, Raclavská was ranked as high as 234 in singles, and made the round of 16 at the 1992 Prague Open. As a doubles player, she had a best ranking of 136, with 22 ITF doubles titles.

ITF Circuit finals

Singles: 11 (6–5)

Doubles: 35 (22–13)

References

External links
 
 

1973 births
Living people
Czech female tennis players
Czechoslovak female tennis players
Sportspeople from Olomouc